CodeSkulptor is an interactive, web-based Python programming environment that allows Python code to be run in a web browser. The application was developed by Scott Rixner, a professor of computer science at Rice University. Its features include visualization of program execution; the ability to conveniently store, edit, and share code online with other users; and cogent error messages that are helpful for debugging code.

Currently, CodeSkulptor must be run in Chrome 18+, Firefox 11+, or Safari 6+ for full functionality.

CodeSkulptor is currently used by students, as well as in Coursera programming courses.

References

External links
: for Python 2
CodeSkulptor3: official version for Python 3

Python (programming language)